Turkey is a nickname of:

 Turkey Gross (1896–1936), American baseball player and manager
 Joe Jones (defensive end) (born 1948), American former National Football League player
 Adrian Mannix (born 1988), Irish hurler
 Turkey Smart (1830–1919), British champion speed skater
 Turkey Stearnes (1901–1979), American baseball player in the Negro leagues

Lists of people by nickname